Saleh Mohamed Soliman (born 24 June 1916) is a former Egyptian weightlifter who competed in the 1936 Summer Olympics.

In 1936 he won the silver medal in the featherweight class.

References 

 Profile

External links
  

1916 births
Possibly living people
Egyptian male weightlifters
Olympic weightlifters of Egypt
Weightlifters at the 1936 Summer Olympics
Olympic silver medalists for Egypt
Olympic medalists in weightlifting
Medalists at the 1936 Summer Olympics
20th-century Egyptian people